Giaginsky District is an administrative and a municipal district (raion), one of the seven in the Republic of Adygea, Russia. It is located in the northern central portion of the republic and borders with Shovgenovsky District in the north, Koshekhablsky District in the east and northeast, Mostovsky District of Krasnodar Krai in the southeast, Maykopsky District in the south, and with Belorechensky District of Krasnodar Krai in the west. Its administrative center is the rural locality (a stanitsa) of Giaginskaya. As of the 2010 Census, the total population of the district was 31,766, with the population of Giaginskaya accounting for 44.5% of that number.

History
Giaginsky District was established within Azov-Black Sea Krai on December 31, 1934 as a result of the downsizing of that krai's districts. On April 10, 1936, Khansky Selsoviet of Maykopsky District of the krai was merged into Giaginsky District and the latter, along with the city of Maykop, was transferred to Adyghe Autonomous Oblast. On February 1, 1963, Maykopsky District of Adyghe Autonomous Oblast was merged into Giaginsky District to create Giaginsky Rural District. However, as the new system of rural districts did not prove to be efficient, Giaginsky District was re-instated in its pre-1963 borders on January 12, 1965.

Administrative and municipal status
Within the framework of administrative divisions, Giaginsky District is one of the seven in the Republic of Adygea and has administrative jurisdiction over all of its thirty rural localities. As a municipal division, the district is incorporated as Giaginsky Municipal District. Its thirty rural localities are incorporated into five rural settlements within the municipal district. The stanitsa of Giaginskaya serves as the administrative center of both the administrative and municipal district.

*Administrative centers are shown in bold

References

Notes

Sources

External links
Official website of Giaginsky District 
Official website of the Republic of Adygea. Information about Giaginsky District 

Districts of Adygea
States and territories established in 1934